Parachela is a genus of cyprinid fishes.  There are currently seven species in this genus which are found in Southeast Asia.

Species 
There are currently seven recognized species in this genus:
 Parachela cyanea Kottelat, 1995
 Parachela hypophthalmus (Bleeker, 1860)
 Parachela ingerkongi (Bănărescu, 1969)
 Parachela maculicauda (H. M. Smith, 1934)
 Parachela oxygastroides (Bleeker, 1852) (Glass fish)
 Parachela siamensis (Günther, 1868)
 Parachela williaminae Fowler, 1934

References

Danios
Cyprinid fish of Asia
Cyprinidae genera